Rayavaram is a small village in Markapur Mandal in the Prakasam District in the state of Andhra Pradesh, India.

Demographics 

Rayavaram village has a population of 2937 of which Males are 1487 and Females are 1450. Total Households in Rayavaram are 783.

References

Villages in Krishna district